Kissui is a vodka from Japan.  It is the only Japanese vodka available in the US as of 2007. It’s distilled and bottled by Takara Shuzo in Kyoto, Japan.

The Brand name “KISSUI” means “absolutely pure” or  “made from one ingredient” or “non-mixed” in Japanese.

Production
Kissui is 100% distilled from rice then it's blended with natural spring water from Fushimi, Kyoto.

Kabuki Mask Symbol
Kabuki is an original Japanese theater form born in the early 17th century, Edo period, The name “Kabuki” comes from the Japanese word “kabuku”, meaning to behave or act in a modern/liberal way. Over the years, Kabuki has come to represent historical beauty of Japan.

Japanese vodkas
Japanese brands